Youcef Yousfi (born 2 October 1941) is an Algerian politician who has been Minister of Energy and Mines between 2010 and 2015. He briefly served as Acting Prime Minister of Algeria in March–April 2014. Yousfi was Algeria's Permanent Representative to the United Nations from 2006 to 2008.

Early life and education
Born in Batna, Yousfi graduated from the École nationale supérieure des industries chimiques (National School of Chemical Engineering) in France, and obtained a PhD in physics from the Université de Nancy. He also has a degree in economics.

Career
Yousfi was a senior lecturer, then a professor of chemical engineering at the National Polytechnic School, and then the Houari Boumediene University of Sciences and Technologies, both in Algiers. He was also director of the chemistry institute there. He was also an oil adviser at the Ministry of Industry and Energy.

In the late 1970s, Yousfi was appointed as marketing vice-president at Sonatrach, and in 1985, he became its CEO. In 1996, he became chief of staff to Algerian President, Liamine Zéroual. In 1997, he was appointed as Minister of Oil and Energy and was also first elected as a member of the People's National Assembly.

In early 1999, Yousfi became president of the Organization of the Petroleum Exporting Countries (OPEC). On 23 December 1999 he was appointed as Minister of Foreign Affairs. He was replaced by Abdelaziz Belkhadem in the post in August 2000, when Yousfi moved on to become Minister-Delegate to Prime Minister, Ali Benflis.

In April 2001, Yousfi was nominated as Ambassador of Algeria to Canada, before becoming Permanent Representative to the United Nations in 2006.

On 1 July 2020, he was sentenced to 3 years in prison on corruption charges.

Personal life
Yousfi is married and has three children.

References

External links
Biography
Algerian News – Yousfi presents his credentials

1941 births
Algerian Ministers of Energy and Mines
Ambassadors of Algeria to Canada
Foreign ministers of Algeria
Government ministers of Algeria
Living people
Members of the People's National Assembly
Nancy-Université alumni
OPEC people
People from Batna, Algeria
Permanent Representatives of Algeria to the United Nations
Heads of government who were later imprisoned
21st-century Algerian people